Wapato Corrections Facility (also known as the Wapato Detention Facility, and colloquially Wapato Jail) is a building that was originally built as a Multnomah County jail in 2003 in the heavy industrial area of St. Johns neighborhood of Portland. It has never been put into service as a jail and was kept vacant until it was repurposed into the Bybee Lakes Hope Center homeless shelter which opened in October 2020.

History 
The Wapato Detention Facility was funded in 1996 by a bond measure defined by Multnomah County Commissioners in Resolution 96–122, and promoted by District Attorney Mike Schrunk and law enforcement as a response to Measure 11. The facility, which cost $58 million, in St.Johns neighborhood built by the Hoffman Construction Company has sat empty since construction halted in 2003. In March 2017, a California-based developer offered $10 million for the property. In November 2017 Multnomah County commissioners voted to sell Wapato to Kehoe Northwest Properties for $10.8 million. Later, Kehoe counter-offered $5 million which was accepted and it was sold to Kehoe for $5 million in April 2018. The proceeds from the sale of Wapato were then marked to be used to create permanent housing.

As of April 17, 2019 the property is owned by developer Jordan Schnitzer and is estimated to have a value of $8.7 million. Budget limitations prevented the county from opening the facility and it has never housed an inmate. It has only seen incidental use such as a location for television and  movie shoots. It has since become infamous, being featured by media such as CNN's Anderson Cooper.

Repurposing 
The facility is located in the heavy industrial, aircraft landing zone overlay area. Previously land use regulations prevented its use as a homeless shelter.

In 2015 a petition was created online to refit the facility to house the homeless and in August 2016 Multnomah County Commissioner Loretta Smith also further supported the effort. After the sale of the jail to Jordan Schnitzer he also received offers to convert Wapato to a homeless shelter and rejected them because of "cost and distance from other public services".

In April 2019, a proposal was made by Kay Toran, who has been the president of Oregon Volunteers of America since 1999, to create a residential treatment program at the facility for adults experiencing addiction and mental health problems. The proposal received support from Schnitzer who called it "fabulous". Before the proposal, Schnitzer had considered using the site as a warehouse for one of his businesses, Harsch Investment Properties. Toran says that if the plan does not receive funding support in the next few years it would likely not be doable.

In October 2019, Schnitzer announced that the plans to convert the facility into a community wellness center to serve the local homeless population had fallen flat. He cited low funding for renovation and a lack of support from elected officials and homeless advocacy organizations in drawing this conclusion. As such, he said, the facility would likely be demolished by the end of 2019.

In February 2020, Wapato jail was on track to be renovated into a 228-bed homeless facility with expected opening of September 2020. By then, $4 million in funds had been raised, enough to operate for two years without any structural changes. In May 2020, the building's owner signed a lease with Bybee Lakes Hope Center for this purpose.

Wapato facility was dedicated as a homeless shelter on August 12, 2020 and it has been in operation since October 2, 2020 with 80 beds, with plans to add approximately 400 beds in December for long term housing.

Oregon state senators Lew Frederick, Betsy Johnson, Elizabeth Steiner Hayward, and Portland Police Union president Daryl Turner sit on the advisory board of Bybee Lake Hope Center.

Emergency temporary facility for COVID-19 patients 
Local media outlets reported on March 19, 2020, that the facility owner Jordan Schnitzer and the Oregon Health Authority are in discussion about opening up the facility as a treatment center for COVID-19 Coronavirus patients who need in-patient care, but do not need ICU care. Schnitzer commented that he hoped to have the facility ready for this purpose by the end of March, 2020.

References

External links 

 
 Official Multnomah County Page "Wapato Detention Facility"

2003 establishments in Oregon
Government buildings in Portland, Oregon
Homeless shelters in the United States